Scottish republicanism is an ideology based on the belief that Scotland should be a republic, as opposed to being under the monarchy of the United Kingdom. Usually, this proposal takes the form of Scottish nationalism and activism for independence, but it is also occasionally found in discussions of changing the system of government of the United Kingdom as a whole in such a manner as to replace the monarch with an elected official as head of state.

History 
Andrew Fletcher of Saltoun is one of the most prominent pre-Union advocates of a Scottish republic, based on agrarian and patriarchal principles. He was a major inspiration to Scottish Enlightenment philosopher Adam Ferguson, whose republican ideals were penned down in An Essay on the History of Civil Society (1767).

One of the foremost documentations of modern Scottish republicanism is the Declaration of Calton Hill, proclaimed on 9 October 2004, the same day that Queen Elizabeth II opened the new Scottish Parliament Building at Holyrood.

In the run-up to the 2014 independence referendum, the Radical Independence Campaign advocated an independent Scottish republic with an elected head of state, instead of the continued union of crowns established with the English monarchy, predating the Acts of Union.

Ahead of the Accession declaration of Charles III at Mercat Cross in Edinburgh on 11 September 2022, the campaign group Our Republic stated "We encourage those with objections to these proclamations to make those clear". The members voiced their opposition to the new King through booing, turning their backs and shouting “no consent”, and holding up anti-Monarchy slogans during the Lord Lyon King of Arms's declaration. They were briefly detained by Police Scotland before being released. One protester was later again arrested and charged under "Breach of the Peace".

Republicanism within the independence movement 
Many people who advocate Scotland becoming a republic do so through their support for Scottish independence. This would entail Scotland becoming independent from the United Kingdom and instead of continuing the Union of the Crowns that predate the political union, a republic would be formed, with an elected Head of State assuming the role of the deposed monarch.

Scotland's largest pro-independence party, the Scottish National Party, favours retaining the monarchy as a Commonwealth realm similar to the situation in other crown countries like Canada, Australia and New Zealand. However, the party has a number of prominent republican members, including Roseanna Cunningham and Tommy Sheppard.

The Scottish National Party proposes that in the event of independence, the presiding officer's post be replaced with that of chancellor of Scotland. In addition to presiding over the Scottish Parliament, the chancellor would possess additional constitutional powers during the absence of the monarch from Scotland; chiefly, the chancellor should act in a role similar to a governor-general in the other Commonwealth realms.

Most of the others major political parties and organisations that advocate Scottish independence also advocate Scotland becoming an independent republic. These include:

 Scottish Greens
 Scottish Socialist Party
 Alba Party
 Scottish Republican Socialist Movement
 Radical Independence Campaign
 Our Republic (cross-constitutional campaign group)

British republicanism 
Another concept for Scotland becoming a republic is through reform of the United Kingdom's constitutional status from a constitutional monarchy to a republican constitution. There is not an explicit link with British unionism, as this tends to advocate the Union of Crowns. This is a form of British republicanism which is supported by English politicians such as Dennis Skinner and Jeremy Corbyn, and advocacy groups such as Republic. There is no mainstream support for this concept in any Scottish political parties, and it remains a personal position, unlike support for an independent Scottish republic which does have party support.

Adam Tomkins is an example of a republican who supports a reformed Britain without monarchy, however his opinion shifted after being elected for the Scottish Conservative & Unionist Party who are ardent supporters of the monarchy. Another example is Scottish Labour MSPs Katy Clark and Mercedes Villalba who advocate for abolishing the Monarchy across the UK as well as radical constitutional reform. The Scottish campaign group Our Republic also contains several members who support Scotland remaining in a reformed Union.

Opinion polling

Polling on the British monarchy with Scotland as part of the UK

Polling on the British monarchy if Scotland becomes independent

More than two main options

See also

Scotland 
 Politics of Scotland
 Our Republic (Scotland)

Other 
 Welsh republicanism
 Republic (political organisation)
 Republicanism in the United Kingdom
 Labour for a Republic
 List of advocates of republicanism in the United Kingdom

References

 
Republicanism in the United Kingdom
Separatism in the United Kingdom
Scottish independence